"Johnny, We Hardly Knew Ye": Memories of John Fitzgerald Kennedy is a 1972 memoir of John F. Kennedy, written by two of his closest friends and advisors, David Powers and Kenneth O'Donnell, in collaboration with journalist Joe McCarthy. The book was a best-seller and was later adapted into a television movie of the same title in 1977.

References

1972 non-fiction books
Non-fiction books about the assassination of John F. Kennedy
Little, Brown and Company books